Rudolf Friedrichs (9 March 1892 – 13 June 1947) was a German politician who served as the Minister-President of Saxony in the German Democratic Republic from 1945 to his death.

Biography 
Friedrichs was born on 9 March 1892 in Plauen, Kingdom of Saxony, German Empire. He attended primary school in Plauen, but moved to Dresden for secondary school. He then began studying law and economics at Leipzig University until 1919, when his studies were interrupted by World War I. He joined the SPD in 1922 and worked from 1923 as a government assessor and from 1926 as a government councillor in the Saxon Interior Ministry. He was on the Dresden City Council from 1930 to 1933, when the Nazi Party seized power in Germany. He was relieved of his duties and was briefly detained. After World War II, he was appointed as Mayor of Dresden on 10 May 1945 by the Soviet city commander. There was tension between Friedrichs and the Communist Politician Kurt Fischer, which escalated in 1947 in the form of an open confrontation. This led to rumours of Fischer's involvement in Friedrichs' sudden death. A study conducted in 1999 by the government of Saxony couldn't confirm nor deny the involvement of Fischer in his death. The cause of death of Friedrichs was never clarified. He was buried at the Waldfriedhof Weisser Hirsch, then was reburied in the Municipal Heidefriedof in 1980.

References 

1892 births
1947 deaths
People from Plauen
Mayors of Dresden
Ministers-President of Saxony
Social Democratic Party of Germany politicians
Socialist Unity Party of Germany politicians